Party sto 13o orofo is the second album of the Greek rock band Trypes and their first with Virgin Records. It was recorded in September and November 1987 and released in the same year on LP and MC. It was re-released as a CD in 1991. The album contains eight tracks.

 (Party on the 13th floor)
 (The first time)
 (Graceless day)
 (Your own nearby America)
 (Schizophrenics in love)
 (Sixth of August)
 (The empire of the cripples)
 (Dance of the cowards)

Trypes albums
1987 albums